Nikolina Ilijanić (born 16 November 1983) is a Croatian female basketball player.

External links
Profile at eurobasket.com
Ilijanić played for "Croatia 2006" team in 2013
2014/2015 Stats Glossary

1983 births
Living people
Sportspeople from Karlovac
Croatian women's basketball players
Point guards
Shooting guards